Umar Eshmurodov born (30 November 1992) is an Uzbekistani footballer who currently plays as a centre-back for FC Nasaf.

Honours

Club
Shurtan
Uzbekistan Pro League winner (2014)
Nasaf
Uzbekistan Super League runner-up (2017)

References

1992 births
Living people
People from Qashqadaryo Region
Uzbekistani footballers
Uzbekistan youth international footballers
Association football midfielders
FC Shurtan Guzar players
FC Nasaf players
Pakhtakor Tashkent FK players
Uzbekistan Super League players